Sinclair Black is an American architect, currently the Roberta P. Crenshaw Centennial Professor in Urban Design and Environmental Planning.  He received a B.Arch. from the University of Texas at Austin, 1962 and M.Arch. From the University of California, Berkeley, 1970

He was awarded the Athena Medal by the Congress for the New Urbanism in 2008.

References

Year of birth missing (living people)
Living people
University of Texas at Austin faculty
20th-century American architects
University of Texas at Austin School of Architecture alumni
UC Berkeley College of Environmental Design alumni
21st-century American architects